Edward Digby (c. 1693 – 2 October 1746) was the third son of William Digby, 5th Baron Digby. He represented Warwickshire as a Tory from his brother Robert's death in 1726 until his own death in 1746.

From about 1725 until his death, he lived in the manor house at Wandsworth, Surrey. At the by-election after the death of his brother Robert in 1726, Edward was returned as Member of Parliament for Warwickshire. A Tory, he frequently spoke in opposition to the Walpole Ministry. During the 1730s, he spoke on several occasions against the employment of a standing army and of foreign troops. He denounced Sir Robert Sutton after the collapse of the Charitable Corporation, supported an unsuccessful place bill to bar government officeholders from parliament in 1734, and opposed the Charitable Uses Act 1735, which imposed more stringent rules on making charitable bequests of land. He also attempted to amend the Exemption from Impressment Act 1739 to provide for the issue of a protection certificate to those rejected for impressment, but was not successful. Outside of Parliament, he, like his father, was active in the Georgia Society, and served as its first chairman.

On 10 July 1729, he married Charlotte Fox (d. November 1778), the daughter of Sir Stephen Fox, by whom he had six sons and one daughter: 
Edward Digby, 6th Baron Digby (1730–1757)
Henry Digby, 1st Earl Digby (1731–1793)
Adm. Robert Digby, RN (1732–1815)
Rev. William Digby (1733–1788)
Col. Stephen Digby (1742–1800)
Rev. Charles Digby (1743–1811), rector of Kilmington, Somerset, married Priscillia Melliar in 1775
Charlotte Digby (died 16 June 1753)

After the collapse of the Walpole ministry in 1742, Digby, writing to his friend John Ward, expressed his discontent over the lack of constructive leadership on the part of the Tories, feeling the Duke of Argyll inferior as a leader to Sir William Wyndham. The secret committee to inquire into Walpole's conduct had, he thought, been rendered nugatory through the failure of the bill to indemnify those giving evidence before it, and he was very much discontented by the machinations which brought the next ministry to power. He died during the lifetime of his father, on 2 October 1746.

References

1690s births
1746 deaths
British MPs 1722–1727
British MPs 1727–1734
British MPs 1734–1741
British MPs 1741–1747
Members of the Parliament of Great Britain for English constituencies
Younger sons of barons
Year of birth uncertain
Edward